"Children of the Universe" is a 2014 song by Molly

Children of the Universe may also refer to:

Books
 Kinder des Weltalls (Children of the Universe), 1970 book by scientist Hoimar von Ditfurth
 Children of the Universe, 1976 issue of Superman comic Super-Sons

Music

Songs
"Children of the Universe" – 16:42 " Carnegie Hall Concert (Toshiko Akiyoshi Jazz Orchestra)
"Children of the Universe", song by John Denver, 1982
"Children of the Universe", song by Dorsey Burnette, 1971
"Children of the Universe", song by Flash, 1972
"Children of the Universe", song by Ras Michael and Sons and Daughters, 1983

See also
Child of the Universe (disambiguation)